Van Der Veken is a surname. Notable people with the surname include:

Bob Van der Veken (born 1928), Belgian actor
Jan Van Der Veken (born 1975), Belgian illustrator
Jef Van der Veken (1872–1964), Belgian art restorer and copyist

Surnames of Belgian origin
Dutch-language surnames